Lou Anders is the author of the Thrones & Bones series of middle grade fantasy novels. Anders is a Hugo Award-winning American editor, a Chesley Award-winning art director, an author and a journalist.

Early life
Lou Anders is originally from Birmingham, Alabama, but has lived in multiple cities in several states. In 2003, he returned to Birmingham, Alabama having moved there from Los Angeles via San Francisco.

He describes his route through the science fiction and writings businesses as broadly beginning with "theatre in college lead[ing] to a partial scholarship to study acting in Oxford and London". This in turn got him into directing plays in Chicago, which lead  to working on sets in Los Angeles, which lead  to journalism & screenwriting, the former being "scifi" based, which lead  to internet publishing, which lead  to publishing.

Career
Anders' break came in 1994, when he became involved with the UK's Titan Publishing when they were about to launch the first Star Trek magazine, Star Trek Monthly (launched in March 1995). Recommended to Titan by Jean-Marc Lofficier, Anders became Titan Publishing Group's 'Los Angeles liaison', "churning out about 30 articles a month on average and living on the Star Trek and Babylon 5 sets". Anders was writing scripts and pitches on the side with a writing partner, and in 1996, was asked to write The Making of Star Trek: First Contact for Titan.

Between 1994 and 1999, Anders wrote around 500 articles, which have appeared in multiple magazines on a variety of - primarily science fiction-related - subjects, and Babylon 5 in particular. His articles have appeared in Babylon 5 Magazine, Doctor Who Magazine, Dreamwatch, Manga Max, Sci Fi Universe, Star Trek Monthly and Star Wars Monthly, and been translated into several languages. Much of his work has also appeared online at sites including Believermag.com, the SF Site, Infinity Plus. and RevolutionSF.com, while many of his Star Trek and Babylon 5 articles and interviews "have been illegally transcribed and are scattered throughout [web]sites the world over".

Editor

Bookface
In late 1999/early 2000, and shortly after two of Anders' then-main journalistic subjects - Star Trek: Deep Space Nine and Babylon 5 spin-off Crusade - were cancelled, he was invited to fly from West Hollywood to San Francisco, to become Executive Editor of www.Bookface.com, an online company providing non-downloadable and non-printable books and short stories for free online reading.

In June 2000, Bookface, Inc. launched the website www.Bookface.com, a "Read on Demand" service precipitated both by the concurrent print on demand boom, and launching during the hype surrounding Stephen King's online-only novella The Plant, which had been launched in July, 1999. Bookface delivered "whole books and excerpts to readers directly", with publishers including HarperCollins, Penguin Puttnam, Random House and Time Warner Trade Publishing lined up to provide Bookface with content.
CEO and co-Founder Tammy Deuster described Bookface as:

essentially providing an ever-present and convenient way to find a book without a special hardware device, without a download, and without even requiring a credit card. A user simply logs on to our website and starts to read.

The idea behind Bookface.com was to provide books for free, "while paying authors and publishers for each page read", through revenue derived from advertising.

Bookface's launch coincided with the bursting of the "dot-com bubble", while its success was tied closely to interest in online "Read on Demand" content (not to be confused with the similar but separate electronic medium, eBooks) becoming widespread. Arguably the highest-profile online-published title of the time was Stephen King's The Plant, whose initial success was cited by Bookface's co-founder and CEO Tammy Deuster as "proof that readers want to explore exciting books, whether those books are delivered in printed or electronic mediums". Despite initial success, however, actual sales of King's novella fell once the media circus had died down, with the ratio of paying readers to total readers falling to less than half by the fourth part of the serial. The Plant serialization came to a halt in late 2000, and Bookface itself followed suit, ceasing trading in early 2001.

In January 2001, Anders edited an anthology entitled Outside the Box: The Best Short Fiction from Bookface.com, which was published by Wildside Press.

Argosy
In 2003, Anders launched Argosy Magazine in collaboration with publisher James A. Owen, serving from 2003 to 2004 as senior editor on the  bimonthly title. It was named after Argosy (a title that dates back to the 19th century), because (as Anders describes in an interview with John C. Snider): "[W]e thought taking a name that harkened back to its spirit was a good launching point from which to found a new magazine, one that sought to set trends for the 21st century, the way Munsey's magazines did for the 19th and 20th.
Despite this, Argosy Magazine, however was stated to have "no connection to the original Frank A. Munsey magazine, or any other incarnation of Argosy ... [it] is a completely new magazine ... a new entity."

The new magazine, "devoted to publishing quality fiction in a wide range of genres and styles, from science fiction and fantasy to mystery to mainstream", and including a smattering of non-fiction essays and interviews, launched in November, 2003, and featured in its first eclectic issue an interview by Adam Roberts with Samuel R. Delany. Argosy format complimented its eclectic nature, accompanying its digest-sized magazine with a "separate trade-paperback novella ... [both] presented in an attractive slipcase".(See left for Argosy #2's cover & slipcase.) The uniqueness of its design proved confusing to retailers, however, leading to subsequent issues being published in two formats: "Connoisseur" (two-volume, available through Argosy, to subscribers and via certain comic shops and independent bookshops) and "Proletarian" (single magazine, available at newsstands).

Having overseen the first two issues (and preparatory work on a third), mounting "creative differences" and concerns caused Anders to resign as editor in early July, 2004 to focus on his work with Pyr while Argosy itself went on hiatus.

Anthologies
Anders has edited a number of anthologies from several different publishers, helped in no small part by having been able to forge links and contacts with sci-fi authors during his time at Bookface. Anders' anthologies include Outside the Box(above) (a 'Print on Demand' collection of short stories that first appeared on Bookface.com) from Wildside Press, Live Without a Net from Roc (although originally planned for a small press, which was going under at the time) and Projections from MonkeyBrain (initially two separate books, "one on literature and one on cinema", co-published by Chris Roberson, who Anders had met through Live Without a Net).

Anders is seen as a particular mentor to Roberson, whom he met at the World Fantasy Convention in Montreal, where he invited Roberson to submit to Live Without a Net. Roberson's work subsequently appeared in Argosy magazine, Anders' FutureShocks and his novels Here, There & Everywhere and Paragaea: A Planetary Romance have both been published by Pyr. Roberson was also featured in the Anders-edited anthology Sideways in Crime (2008).

Anders notes that his anthology Live Without a Net was a direct reaction against a certain type of science fiction. He says, in interview with Rick Kleffel:

I was reacting to what I felt was a preponderance of post-cyberpunk in American science fiction in the year 2000. The anthology was a deliberate attempt to counter that trend in some small and useful way.

Pyr
Having been encouraged to apply to Prometheus Books' advert for "someone to help them launch a new SF line", Anders has been editorial director of Prometheus Books' science fiction imprint Pyr, since its launch in March, 2005. Pyr is an imprint of Prometheus Books, and its titles under Anders have been nominated for multiple awards. Anders hopes that the imprint will help regain science fiction's "grounding in science", while making sure to note that that is not the be-all and end-all. He is adamant that the imprint not be so narrow as to confine our authors to one agenda, so that while I am selecting books that mesh broadly with their overall aesthetic, I'm not limiting us to just one mode or subgenre or philosophical position ... [however] I'm hoping Pyr will stay slanted towards science fiction over fantasy, while publishing engaging and intelligent offerings from both genres. I have a real need for hard science fiction.

He states that it is the core concept that is important, that:

If a story can survive without the speculative element and is only using the science fiction as backdrop, then I'm not interested.

Pyr's launch titles in its "first season" comprised eight titles - "four original novels, two North American debuts, one classic reprint, and one anthology". The authors (and anthologist Gardner Dozois) were all recipients of multiple industry awards and/or nominations, and were:

weighted towards hard SF, but contain two fantasies (one secondary world, one historical), one sci-fantasy or soft SF, and an anthology of stories examining the very Promethean struggle of science vs. superstition.

Those, Anders stated, were "highly reflective" of his subsequent intentions as editor, which he says are similar to those of Robert Silverberg, effectively "pruning" science fiction to its relevant core.

Anders is particularly proud to have brought John Meaney to American attention. Pyr's published authors also include Michael Moorcock, Alan Dean Foster, Adam Roberts, Mike Resnick, Justina Robson, Joe Abercrombie, and Ian McDonald.

Anders left Pyr in September 2014 to concentrate on writing full-time.

Awards and nominations

Anders was nominated for a Hugo Award for Best Editor Long Form seven years in a row, in 2007, 2008, 2009, 2010, 2011, 2012, and 2013 winning in 2011. He is a 2008 Philip K. Dick Award nominee for his anthology, Fast Forward 2, and a 2010 Locus Award, World Fantasy Award and Shirley Jackson Award nominee for his anthology, Swords & Dark Magic, edited with Jonathan Strahan. He was nominated for a Chesley Award for Best Art Director in 2007, 2009, 2010, 2011, 2012, 2103, and 2014, winning in 2009. He is a 2006 and a 2011 World Fantasy Special Award: Professional nominee for editing at Pyr.

His middle grade fantasy novel Frostborn has been nominated for a 2015-16 Utah Beehive Book Award, a 2016-17 Nebraska Golden Sower Award, a 2016-17 Indiana Young Hoosier Book Award, and a 2016-17 Pennsylvania Young Reader's Choice Award. He was chosen as the 2016 Thurber House Children's Writer-in-Residence.

Other appearances
Anders also features as a recurring fictional cartoon character in Jim Woodward's real-life comic book stories These Things Happen.

Bibliography

Novels
 Frostborn (Thrones and Bones Book One) (Crown Books for Young Readers August 5, 2014) Cover by Justin Gerard 
 Nightborn (Thrones and Bones Book Two) (Crown Books for Young Readers July 14, 2015) Cover by Justin Gerard 
 Skyborn (Thrones and Bones Book Three) (Crown Books for Young Readers September 6, 2016) Cover by Justin Gerard

Anthologies
Outside the Box: The Best Short Fiction from Bookface.com (ed.) (Wildside Press (2001)) Cover by John Picacio 
Contributors include: Fiona Avery • Paul Cornell • John Grant • Graham Joyce • Paul Melko • Vera Nazarian • Kate Orman • J. Michael Straczynski
Live Without a Net (ed.) (Roc Books (Jul, 2004)) Cover by John Picacio (US Trade)  US MM Paperback 
Contributors include: Stephen Baxter • David Brin • Paul Di Filippo • Pat Cadigan • John Grant • Alex Irvine • John Meaney • Paul Melko • Mike Resnick • Chris Roberson • Adam Roberts • Rudy Rucker • S. M. Stirling • Charles Stross • Matthew Sturges • Michael Swanwick
 Projections: Science Fiction in Literature & Film (ed.) (MonkeyBrain (Dec, 2004)) Cover by John Picacio 
Contributors include: Catherine Asaro • David Brin • John Clute • Paul Cornell • Mark Finn • James Gunn • John Grant • Howard V. Hendrix • Jonathan Lethem • Robert A. Metzger • Sean McMullen • Michael Moorcock • Adam Roberts • Mike Resnick • Robert J. Sawyer • Lucius Shepard • Robert Silverberg • Michael Swanwick
 FutureShocks (ed.) (Roc Books (Jan, 2006)) Cover by John Picacio 
 Contributors include: Paul Di Filippo • Kevin J. Anderson • Robert Charles Wilson • John Meaney • Alan Dean Foster • Robert J. Sawyer • Louise Marley • Mike Resnick • Harry Turtledove • Alex Irvine • Caitlín R. Kiernan • Chris Roberson • Adam Roberts
 Fast Forward 1 (ed.) (Pyr (Feb, 2007)) Cover by John Picacio 
 Contributors include: Robert Charles Wilson • Justina Robson • Robyn Hitchcock • Tony Ballantyne • Elizabeth Bear • Stephen Baxter • Larry Niven • Ken MacLeod • Mike Resnick • Nancy Kress • Ian McDonald • Gene Wolfe • John Meaney • Paul Di Filippo • Paolo Bacigalupi • Kage Baker • A. M. Dellamonica • Louise Marley • Pamela Sargent • Mary A. Turzillo • George Zebrowski
 Sideways in Crime (ed.) (Solaris (June 2008)) Cover by Bob Eggleton 
 Contributors include: Kage Baker • John Meaney • Stephen Baxter • Paul Park • Jack McDevitt • Kristine Kathryn Rusch • Mary Rosenblum • Paul Di Filippo • Jon Courtenay Grimwood • Theodore Judson • Pat Cadigan • S. M. Stirling • Mike Resnick & Eric Flint • Tobias S. Buckell • Chris Roberson
 Fast Forward 2 (ed.) (Pyr (October 2008)) Cover by John Picacio 
 Contributors include: Paul Cornell • Kay Kenyon • Chris Nakashima-Brown • Nancy Kress • Jack Skillingstead • Cory Doctorow and Benjamin Rosenbaum • Jack McDevitt • Paul McAuley • Mike Resnick and Pat Cadigan • Ian McDonald • Kristine Kathryn Rusch • Karl Schroeder and Tobias S. Buckell • Jeff Carlson • Paolo Bacigalupi
 Swords & Dark Magic: The New Sword and Sorcery (ed., with Jonathan Strahan) (Eos (June 2010)) Cover by Benjamin Carre 
 Contributors include: Steven Erikson • Glen Cook • Gene Wolfe • James Enge • C. J. Cherryh • K. J. Parker • Garth Nix • Michael Moorcock • Tim Lebbon • Robert Silverberg • Greg Keyes • Michael Shea • Scott Lynch • Tanith Lee • Caitlin R Kiernan • Bill Willingham • Joe Abercrombie
 Masked (ed.) (Gallery Books (July 2010)) Cover by Trevor Hairsine 
 Contributors include: Matthew Sturges • James Maxey • Paul Cornell • Mike Carey • Mike Baron • Daryl Gregory • Gail Simone • Stephen Baxter • Chris Roberson • Peter David and Kathleen David • Joseph Mallozzi • Mark Chadbourn • Marjorie M. Liu • Ian McDonald • Bill Willingham

Short fiction
"Crowd Control" in Strange Pleasures 2 by John Grant and Dave Hutchinson (ed.s) (Prime Books (June 2003)) 
"The Woman on the Cross" in Strange Pleasures 3 by Dave Hutchinson (ed.) (Prime Books (Oct, 2005)) 
"The Mad Lands, Part 1: Death Wish" in Adventure, Vol. I by Chris Roberson (ed.) (MonkeyBrain (Nov, 2005)) 
"Generation Gap" in the Doctor Who anthology Short Trips: Transmissions (2008)
"And How His Audit Stands" in The Clockwork Jungle Book (Shimmer Magazine Issue #11) (2009)

Selected non-fiction
The Making of Star Trek: First Contact (Titan Books, 1996) 
 The Greenwood Encyclopedia of Science Fiction and Fantasy : Themes, Works, and Wonders (3 vols.) by Gary Westfahl (ed.) (Greenwood Press (Sep, 2005)) 
Contributions include: "Babylon 5 (1993-1998) and films", "Batman (1989) &c.", "Doctor Who (1963-1989) and films", "Drugs", "Individualism and Conformity" and "Religion" 
 "A Tale of Two Orphans" in The Man from Krypton: A Closer Look at Superman by Glenn Yeffeth (ed.) (BenBella Books (May, 2006)) 
 "A Word Of Warning For Brandon Routh" in The Man from Krypton: A Closer Look at Superman by Glenn Yeffeth (ed.) (BenBella Books (May 2006)) 
 Counsel for the Prosection: "Star Wars novels are poor substitutes for real science fiction and are driving real SF off the shelves" in Star Wars on Trial by David Brin & Matthew Woodring Stover (ed.s) (BenBella Books (June, 2006)) 
"The Natural and the Unnatural: Verisimilitude in Battlestar Galactica" in So Say We All: Collected Thoughts and Opinions on Battlestar Galactica by Richard Hatch (ed.) (BenBella Books (Oct, 2006)) 
"The Tangled Web We Weave" in Webslinger: SF and Comic Writers on Your Friendly Neighborhood Spider-Man by Glenn Yeffeth (ed.) (BenBella Books (Mar, 2007)) 
"New Directions: Mind the Gap": an online essay on the different branches of Science fiction at RevolutionSF

References

External links
Lou Anders' homepage
Lou Anders' blog "Bowing to the Future"
Thrones & Bones official website 
Lou Anders' Amazon blog
Prometheus Books' science fiction/fantasy imprint Pyr Books's website
David Alastair Hayden interviews Lou Anders for Redstone Science Fiction
John Snider interviews Lou Anders about Argosy Magazine
Archived submission information for Argosy at Locus
"New Directions: Mind the Gap" essay by Lou Anders at RevolutionSF
Interview on the SciFiDimensions Podcast

Living people
American science fiction writers
21st-century American novelists
Science fiction editors
American book editors
American magazine editors
American online publication editors
American speculative fiction editors
American male journalists
Year of birth missing (living people)
Writers from Birmingham, Alabama
American male novelists
Hugo Award-winning editors
Journalists from Alabama
21st-century American male writers
21st-century American non-fiction writers